Wolfgang Hildesheimer (9 December 1916 – 21 August 1991) was a German author who incorporated the Theatre of the Absurd. He originally trained as an artist, before turning to writing.

Biography
Hildesheimer was born of Jewish parents in Hamburg. His grandfather was Azriel Hildesheimer, the moderniser of Orthodox Judaism in Germany. He was educated at the Humanistisches Gymnasium in Mannheim from 1926 to 1930. He then attended Odenwaldschule until 1933, when he left Germany. He was then educated at Frensham Heights School in Surrey, England. He studied carpentry in Mandatory Palestine, where his parents had emigrated, and underwent psychoanalysis in Jerusalem. He studied painting and stage building in London.

In 1946 he worked as a translator and clerk at the Nuremberg trials. Afterward, he worked as a writer and was a member of Group 47. In 1980, he gave the inaugural address at the Salzburg Festival, "Was sagt Musik aus?" (What does music say?). In addition to writing, Hildesheimer created collages which he collected in several volumes (the first Endlich allein, 1984), an activity he shared with other late-20th century writers Peter Weiss and Ror Wolf. The municipality of Poschiavo in Switzerland made Hildesheimer an honorary citizen in 1982; he died there in 1991.

Works 
 1952 , short stories
 1953 Das Paradies der falschen Vögel 1954 An den Ufern der Plotinitza, radio play
 1955 Der Drachenthron, comedy in three acts
 1955 , radio play
 1954 Das Märchen von Prinzessin Turandot (The Fairy Tale of Princess Turandot), radio play
 1958 Pastorale oder Die Zeit für Kakao, play
 1960 Herrn Walsers Raben, radio play
 1961 Die Verspätung, play
 1962 Vergebliche Aufzeichnungen 1965 Tynset, a novel
 1971 Zeiten in Cornwall, travelogue
 1973 Masante, a novel
 1977 , a biography of Wolfgang Amadeus Mozart
 1981 , a fictional biography of Sir Andrew Marbot
 1983 Mitteilungen an Max (Über den Stand der Dinge und anderes)Awards
 Hörspielpreis der Kriegsblinden (a radio play prize for Princess Turandot'') 1955
 Georg Büchner Prize 1966
 Order of Merit of the Federal Republic of Germany (Großes Verdienstkreuz) 1983

References 

1916 births
1991 deaths
German male dramatists and playwrights
Writers from Hamburg
People from Poschiavo
Jewish emigrants from Nazi Germany to the United Kingdom
German biographers
Male biographers
Georg Büchner Prize winners
Commanders Crosses of the Order of Merit of the Federal Republic of Germany
People educated at Frensham Heights School
20th-century German dramatists and playwrights
20th-century biographers
20th-century German male writers
German male non-fiction writers